Should've Gone to Bed is the third EP from American pop punk band Plain White T's, released on April 9, 2013. The video for "Should've Gone to Bed" was loaded on YouTube in June, 2013. Mixed by Joe Zook.

Track listing

References

External links
 Plain White T's official website

Pop punk EPs
2013 EPs
Plain White T's albums
Hollywood Records EPs